Kiphire District (Pron:/ˈkɪfɑɪə/) is a district in the Indian state of Nagaland. At , the district is the tenth-most populous district of Nagaland and 625th most populous district in India with 74,004 inhabitants. The district is home to 3.74% population of Nagaland. The district headquarters is at Kiphire, 230 kilometres from state-capital Kohima. It is the fourth most backward district in India, according to the 2018 NITI Aayog rankings.

History
Kiphire district was carved out of Tuensang district in 2003. It became the eleventh district of Nagaland after it was carved out. An administrative headquarters at Kiphire was created on 16 June 1952 after surveys were done to open more administrative headquarters. The district was formally created in 2003 with 7 subdivisions, namely, Seyochung, Pungro, Amahator, Kiphire Sadar, Longmatra, Sitimi and Kiusam. Another subdivision, namely, Khongsa was carved out of Pungro subdivision taking the total number of subdivisions of Kiphire district to 8. The first Base Area Superintendent of the district was S.D. Lakhar. The district was earlier part of the Tuensang district which was under the NEFA.

Geography
It is bounded by Tuensang and Noklak districts in the north, Zünheboto district in the west, Phek district in the south and Myanmar in the east. It is headquartered at Kiphire, which is at an altitude of 896 m above sea level. The major towns of this district are Seyochung, Sitimi, Pungro and Kiphire. Nagaland's highest peak, Mount Saramati (3826 metres) is located in this district. Kiphire also has an earth station. Kisatong village is another tourist destination in the district.

Climate
The overall climate of the district is hot and humid during the summers and cold during winter. The temperature during the winter months touches a low of 2.7 degrees Celsius while in summer it reaches a high of 37.0 degrees Celsius. The district enjoys south-east Monsoon with average rainfall between 1500 mm to 1800 mm occurring over about 6
months from May to October.

Administration
The district headquarters is at Kiphire. The district has 8 subdivisions namely Kiphire Sadar, Pungro, Seyochung, Khongsa, Amahator, Kiusam, Longmatra and Sitimi. The present Deputy Commissioner of the district is T. Wati Aier.

Demographics

According to the 2011 census Kiphire District has a population of 74,004, roughly equal to the nation of Dominica. This gives it a ranking of 625th in India (out of a total of 640). Kiphire has a sex ratio of 956 females for every 1000 males, and a literacy rate of 69.54%.

The district is predominantly inhabited by the Sangtam, Chirr, Makware, Yimkhiung and Sümi tribes. The tribal population constitutes 96.5% of the entire district.

Religion
Christianity is the largest religion in the district, followed by 97% of the people. Hinduism is the second-largest religion with 1.41% adherents. Islam and Buddhism form 0.76% and 0.28% of the population respectively.

Languages
The following languages, namely Sangtam, Sümi, Chirr, Makury and Yimkhiungrü are spoken in Kiphire District.

Government and Politics

The district has two vidhan sabha constituences, namely, Seyochung Sitimi and Pungro Kiphire. The MLA of Seyochung Sitimi is V. Kashiho Sangtam of the BJP and the MLA of Pungro Kiphire is T. Yangseo Sangtam who is an independent politician. The last elections were held in 2018. The next legislative assembly election will be held in 2023.

As part of Lok Sabha, Kiphire district is part of the Nagaland Lok Sabha constituency. In the 2019 Indian general election, Tokheho Yepthomi of the NDPP won by 16,000 votes over his rival K.L. Chishi of the Indian National Congress. The next general election is in 2024.

Economy

Agriculture
Around 70% of the population of Kiphire district is engaged in agriculture. The main agricultural system practised in the district is Shifting cultivation or Jhum cultivation. Rice, Maize, a local variety of kidney beans called Kholar and Soya beans constitutes the major crops in the jhum fields. About 32 groups of crops are widely grown in the district. Out of these, cereals such as Rice, Maize, millets are the most widely cultivated crops in terms of production and area coverage. Other crops grown are varieties of pulses and cash crops such as potatoes. Oranges. Papayas, Bananas and Pineapples are the major fruits grown throughout the district.

Industry

There are no major industries in the district. However, weaving forms the most important industry in the district. Basket weaving and Woodworking are common household industries practised by many people in Kiphire district and throughout Nagaland.

Education
According to the 2011 census of India, the district has a literacy rate of 69.54%. The Scheduled Tribes have a literacy rate of 96.52%.

Colleges
 Zisaji Presidency College, Kiphire

Tourism

Tourist footfall in Kiphire district is low. Connectivity and communication infrastructure is very limited in the district. The number of tourists visiting Kiphire has seen growth in the past few years. Below are few of the tourist attractions in the district:

Mount Saramati, peak 
Limestone Caves, Salumi and Mimi villages
Zungki River
Fakim Wildlife Sanctuary, Fakim

The limestone caves at Saluni, Mimi and other villages in Pungro subdivision are yet to be explored. The Tizu/Zungki River is a national waterway. It was declared a national waterway in 2016.

Transportation

Air
The nearest airports are Dimapur Airport and Imphal Airport located 307 and 318 kilometres from the district headquarters Kiphire. There are two helipads in the district. One is in Kiusam and the other is in Pungro.

Rail
The nearest railway station is Dimapur railway station located 313 kilometres from district headquarters Kiphire.

Road
The district is connected with roads and highways. The NH 202 passes through the district alongside other intra-district roads. Nagaland State Transport buses are available from Dimapur for Kiphire and Pungro. Private taxis can be availed as well.

Notes

References

External links

 Official site
 Nagaland Tourism
 Fakim Wildlife Sanctuary

 
Districts of Nagaland
2004 establishments in Nagaland